Jason Schleifer (born April 3, 1973) is an American animator, character technical director, and entrepreneur. Schleifer started his career at Alias/Wavefront where he was a product specialist during the development of Maya. His technical expertise in character rigging led him to work as a character technical director and eventually animation lead at Weta Digital where he helped create and animate the character, Gollum for the Lord of the Rings trilogy. In 2003 Schleifer moved back to the U.S. to work at PDI/DreamWorks in Redwood City, CA where he became Head of Character Animation and worked on feature films including Madagascar, Over the Hedge, Megamind, and Mr. Peabody & Sherman.

Jason Schleifer has a B.A. in High Honors from the University of California, Santa Barbara. He also received an Honorary Doctorate of Animation from the Digital Media Arts College in Boca Raton, Florida.

In 2014 Schleifer co-founded Nimble Collective with DreamWorks alumni Rex Grignon, Bruce Wilson and Scott LaFleur.

Filmography

References

External links 
 
 
 Animation World Network profile for Jason Schleifer
 Jason Schleifer interview for the Animation Addicts podcast

Computer animation people
1973 births
Living people
University of California, Santa Barbara alumni